Christoph Bergner (born 24 November 1948) is a German politician and member of the conservative CDU. Bergner was the 3rd Minister President of Saxony-Anhalt from 1993 until 1994.

Life and political career

Christoph Bergner was born in Zwickau, Sachsen. After finishing his agronomy studies in 1971, he earned a doctorate and worked as a research associate at the Institut für Biochemie der Pflanzen der Akademie der Wissenschaften der DDR from 1974 until 1990.

Bergner was Minister-President of Saxony-Anhalt from 1993 until 1994. Since 2002, he has been a member of the Bundestag; since 2005, a secretary of state in the Federal Ministry of the Interior (Germany); since 2006, he is Federal commissioner for national minorities.

Christoph Bergner is a member of the Protestant church and has a critical estimation of Communism. He is married with three children.

See also

Federal Ministry of the Interior (Germany)
Cabinet Merkel II
Framework Convention for the Protection of National Minorities
European Charter for Regional or Minority Languages
Volga Germans
Russian Mennonite
Deutsche Nationalkreis Asowo
Deutsche Nationalkreis Halbstadt

References

External links

 Official website (CDU)
 Parliament (Deutscher Bundestag) - biography
 Federal Ministry of the Interior (BMI) - biography

1948 births
Living people
People from Zwickau
Members of the Landtag of Saxony-Anhalt
Members of the Bundestag for Saxony-Anhalt
Ministers-President of Saxony-Anhalt
Members of the Bundestag 2013–2017
Members of the Bundestag 2009–2013
Members of the Bundestag 2005–2009
Members of the Bundestag 2002–2005
Members of the Bundestag for the Christian Democratic Union of Germany